The 1973 Tulsa Golden Hurricane football team represented the University of Tulsa during the 1973 NCAA Division I football season. In their second year under head coach F. A. Dry, the Golden Hurricane compiled a 6–5 record, 5–1 against conference opponents, and won the Missouri Valley Conference co-championship.

The team's statistical leaders included Joe McCulley with 1,579 passing yards, Freddie Carolina with 540 rushing yards, and Steve Largent with 501 receiving yards. Largent went on to play 14 years in the National Football League and was inducted into the Pro Football Hall of Fame.

Schedule

References

Tulsa
Tulsa Golden Hurricane football seasons
Missouri Valley Conference football champion seasons
Tulsa Golden Hurricane football